Ninodes splendens is a moth in the family Geometridae described by Arthur Gardiner Butler in 1878. It is found in Japan.

References

Abraxini